Callimetopus lituratus is a species of beetle in the family Cerambycidae. It was described by Per Olof Christopher Aurivillius in 1926 and is known from the Moluccas.

References

Callimetopus
Beetles described in 1926